Letterboxd is an online social networking service co-founded by Matthew Buchanan and Karl von Randow in 2011. It was launched as a social app focused on sharing opinions about, and love of film, and is maintained by a small team in Auckland, New Zealand. The site allows users to share their taste in films. Members can write reviews or share their opinions about films, keep track of what they have seen in the past, record viewing dates, make lists of films and showcase their favorite films, as well as meet and interact with other cinephiles. Films can be rated, reviewed, added to a specific date's diary entry, included in a list, and tagged with relevant keywords.

History 
The site was launched at Brooklyn Beta. It transitioned from private to public beta on 24 April 2012, and all pages became publicly visible. It originally started with 23 films. Membership remained invitation-only until 8 February 2013, when it was opened for public use. The site also introduced a tiered structure, with both free and paid memberships, which allow access to multiple features including personalized "Year in Review" pages. In September 2020, Letterboxd announced a new membership type for film-related organizations, from festivals to arthouse theaters to podcasts, to participate with tools better suited than the individual-oriented basic profile.

The userbase doubled from the previous year to more than 3 million by January 2021. In an article for The Ringer, film critic Scott Tobias called Letterboxd "the safest space for film discussion we've got" due to its community and discussion-based model in the midst of the COVID-19 pandemic.

The 100 millionth film was marked as watched on the site on 15 May 2017, six years after launch. , members have marked over 1 billion films as watched.

Features 
Anyone can read content on the site. An account is required for users who want to participate. All members can rate films, review films, and tag them with relevant keywords. They may also maintain lists of films they have watched or want to watch, and interact with other members. Lists can be made public or private to the user. Ratings follow the five-star system, with half-stars also allowed. A follower model enables members to follow and get updates about the activity of others on the site.

Letterboxd is available as a mobile app for Android and iOS.

Film data
All film-related metadata used on the website is supplied by The Movie Database (TMDB), an open source database. In September 2019, the site partnered with JustWatch to display online viewing options for films. In March 2022, the site partnered with Nanocrowd to show "nanogenres" and recommendations for similar films to users.

References

External links 

2011 establishments in New Zealand
Internet properties established in 2011
New Zealand film websites
New Zealand social networking websites
Online film databases
Social cataloging applications